Pionosyllis is a genus of polychaetes belonging to the family Syllidae.

The genus has cosmopolitan distribution.

Species:

Pionosyllis comosa 
Pionosyllis compacta 
Pionosyllis gigantea 
Pionosyllis heterochaetosa 
Pionosyllis kerguelensis 
Pionosyllis koolalya 
Pionosyllis longisetosa 
Pionosyllis lucida 
Pionosyllis magnifica 
Pionosyllis malmgreni 
Pionosyllis manca 
Pionosyllis nidrosiensis 
Pionosyllis petalecirrus 
Pionosyllis stylifera 
Pionosyllis suchumica

References

Annelids